Ridvan Kardesoglu (born 12 October 1996) is a Liechtensteiner footballer who plays as a forward for FC Nenzing and the Liechtenstein national team.

Career
Kardesoglu made his international debut for Liechtenstein on 15 November 2019 in a UEFA Euro 2020 qualifying match against Finland, which finished as a 0–3 away loss.

Personal life
Kardesoglu is of Turkish descent.

Career statistics

International

References

External links
 
 
 

1996 births
Living people
People from Vaduz
Liechtenstein footballers
Liechtenstein under-21 international footballers
Liechtenstein international footballers
Liechtenstein expatriate footballers
Liechtenstein expatriate sportspeople in Switzerland
Expatriate footballers in Switzerland
Liechtenstein people of Turkish descent
Association football forwards
USV Eschen/Mauren players
FC Chur 97 players
Swiss 1. Liga (football) players
2. Liga Interregional players